The 2001 European Athletics Junior Championships was an athletics competition for athletes under-20 which was held at the Stadio Olimpico Carlo Zecchini in Grosseto, Italy from 19 – 22 July 2001. A total of 44 events were contested, 22 by male and 22 by female athletes. Two new events were introduced into the programme: the women's 2000 metres steeplechase and the women's 10,000 m track walk (replacing the 5000 m walk event). Five new championships records were recorded over the four-day competition, in addition to the two marks set in the newly introduced events.

Russia topped the medals table with eight golds and shared the honour of the greatest medal haul (17) with second placed Great Britain which won six gold medals. Poland came third with five golds, although fourth placed Germany had a larger medal total (15) but with one less gold medal.

Two British sprinters were nominated as the best athletes of the tournament: Vernicha James won the women's award for her 200 metres and 4×400 metres relay gold medals, as well as a 4×400 metres relay bronze. Mark Lewis-Francis took the men's award for his 100 metres gold and for anchoring the men's sprint relay to the team title. Russian Anastasiya Ilyina won the gold in the long jump and triple jump, setting a championship record in the latter event. Former Ethiopian Elvan Abeylegesse did the 3000/5000 metres double for Turkey, breaking the championship record in the 5000 m. Michał Hodun of Poland took the shot put and discus gold medals, while Belgian athlete Kevin Rans completed an unusual silver medal double at the competition in the 200 m and the pole vault.

Among the athletes who won medals at the competition were Carolina Klüft, Yelena Isinbayeva and Andreas Thorkildsen – all of whom went on to become 2004 Olympic gold medallists. Elvan Abeylegesse, Anna Chicherova and Marian Oprea also went on to win Olympic medals. The decathlon junior champion Ladji Doucouré successfully changed focus to the 110 metres hurdles, becoming the 2005 World Champion.

Records

Medal summary

Men

Women

Medal table

Key

See also
2001 in athletics (track and field)

References
General
Russi, Nicholas (2006-06-14). 16th European Junior Championships 2001 - Blue sky, blue track and a lot of Italian enthusiasm. European Athletics. Retrieved on 2010-07-19.
Results
European Junior Championships Statistics database. European Athletics. Retrieved on 2010-07-19.
European Junior Championships (Men). GBR Athletics. Retrieved on 2010-07-19.
European Junior Championships (Women). GBR Athletics. Retrieved on 2010-07-19.

E
European Athletics U20 Championships
International athletics competitions hosted by Italy
2001 in Italian sport
2001 in youth sport
Sport in Grosseto